Grinnell is a city in Poweshiek County, Iowa, United States. The population was 9,564 at the time of the 2020 census. It is best known for being the home of Grinnell College.

History 
Grinnell was founded by settlers from New England who were descended from English Puritans of the 1600s.  Grinnell was founded in 1854 by four men: Josiah B. Grinnell, a Congregationalist from Vermont; Homer Hamlin, a minister; Henry Hamilton, a surveyor; and Dr. Thomas Holyoke. The city was to be named "Stella," but J. B. Grinnell convinced the others to adopt his name, describing it as rare and concise. Grinnell was incorporated on April 28, 1865, and by 1880 Grinnell had a population of around 2000. Located at the junction of two railway lines (east–west line of the Rock Island Railroad and the north–south Minneapolis and St. Louis Railway), it is the largest community in Poweshiek County.

Grinnell was a stop on the Underground Railroad from its founding. One of the most famous events occurred in February 1859, when abolitionist John Brown, and 12 slaves he was helping escape to freedom, were hosted by J. B. Grinnell and several other community residents. Because of J. B. Grinnell's efforts to help slaves and end slavery, in 2013 the National Park Service included his gravesite at Hazelwood Cemetery on the National Underground Railroad Network to Freedom listings.

The Mormon Trail ran along the southern edge of Grinnell. The trail was traveled by an estimated 100,000 plus travelers from 1846 to 1869, including some 70,000 Mormons escaping religious persecution.  The Pioneer Company of 1846–1847 established the first route; from Nauvoo, Illinois, to Salt Lake City.  A stone marker memorializes the Mormon Handcart Trail and the grave of a child who died along the trail near Grinnell.

Grinnell is home to Grinnell College, a highly rated private liberal arts college established in 1846. Grinnell College is now nationally recognized as a leading undergraduate institution. In July 2006, The New York Times included Grinnell in its profile of the 20 colleges and universities of "established or rising scholarship" which are fast becoming viable alternatives to Ivy League institutions, and is considered one of the 30 Hidden Ivies.  While Grinnell athletics has had success in different sports over the years, one early victory is especially notable. On November 19, 1889, Grinnell College and the University of Iowa played each other at Grinnell in the first football game played west of the Mississippi River. Grinnell was victorious with a score of 24–0.

Two major events marked the early years of the community.  On June 17, 1882, a violent, estimated, F5 tornado destroyed most of the college campus and much of the community with a death toll of 68, causing up to $1.3 million in total damages (in 1882 USD).  In June, 1889, fire destroyed most of the downtown area.

Grinnell was home to the Spaulding Manufacturing Company. H. W. Spaulding began making carriages and spring wagons in Grinnell in 1876.  In 1909, Spaulding Manufacturing added automobiles to its production line.  At one time, the factory was the largest employer in the county. Automobile production ceased at the Spaulding factory in 1916 when it could no longer compete with the cheaper Ford automobile. The Spaulding factory site became home to the Spaulding Center for Transportation/Iowa Transportation Museum, as well as a 77 unit loft apartment complex which opened in 2017.

Geography 

Climate 
Grinnell has a humid continental climate with hot humid summers, and cold snowy winters. The precipitation averages 38.19 in (970 mm) yearly.  Summers are the rainiest times of year, with over two thirds of the precipitation falling between April and September in an average year.

Demographics

2010 census
As of the census of 2010, there were 9,218 people, 3,567 households, and 2,026 families residing in the city. The racial makeup of the city was 91.9% White, 2.0% African American, 0.3% Native American, 2.7% Asian, 0.2% Pacific Islander, 0.8% from other races, and 2.1% from two or more races. Hispanic or Latino of any race were 3.2% of the population.

There were 3,567 households, of which 27.1% had children under the age of 18 living with them, 43.4% were married couples living together, 10.4% had a female householder with no husband present, 3.0% had a male householder with no wife present, and 43.2% were non-families. Of all households 36.8% were made up of individuals, and 16.4% had someone living alone who was 65 years of age or older. The average household size was 2.16 and the average family size was 2.82.

The median age in the city was 35.6 years. 19% of residents were under the age of 18; 21.4% were between the ages of 18 and 24; 18.4% were from 25 to 44; 21.9% were from 45 to 64; and 19.1% were 65 years of age or older. The gender makeup of the city was 47.3% male and 52.7% female.

2000 census
As of the census of 2000, there were 9,105 people, 3,498 households, and 2,067 families residing in the city. The racial makeup of the city was 94.88% White, 1.04% African American, 0.29% Native American, 2.01% Asian, 0.10% Pacific Islander, 0.37% from other races, and 1.31% from two or more races. Hispanic or Latino of any race were 1.57% of the population.

There were 3,498 households, out of which 27.5% had children under the age of 18 living with them, 47.2% were married couples living together, 9.5% had a female householder with no husband present, and 40.9% were non-families. Of all households, 34.7% were made up of individuals, and 16.4% had someone living alone who was 65 years of age or older. The average household size was 2.23 and the average family size was 2.84.

In the city, the population was spread out, with 20.5% under the age of 18, 19.9% from 18 to 24, 22.2% from 25 to 44, 19.0% from 45 to 64, and 18.5% who were 65 years of age or older. The median age was 35 years. For every 100 females, there were 85.6 males. For every 100 females age 18 and over, there were 80.7 males.

The median income for a household in the city was $35,625, and the median income for a family was $48,991. Males had a median income of $33,956 versus $23,864 for females. The per capita income for the city was $17,939. About 8.9% of families and 13.3% of the population were below the poverty line, including 16.1% of those under age 18 and 8.1% of those age 65 or over.

Economy 

In addition to Grinnell College, other major employers include Grinnell Mutual Reinsurance Company, Grinnell Regional Medical Center, JELD-WEN and Brownell's.

Downtown renovations 
In the spring of 2005, Grinnell embarked upon a renovation project to make its downtown area more inviting. It encompassed new water mains, restoration of two-way traffic flow, brick crosswalks in the middle of each block, and more uniform parking spaces in front of downtown businesses.  A median strip at each intersection was designed with Grinnell's distinctive Jewel Box pattern.  Infrastructure upgrades and aesthetic renovations were also planned for the southern section of the downtown area, to include Commercial Street. Downtown street improvements have continued and as of 2016 nearly all downtown streets have been redone. Improvements have been made to many business facades. Central Park underwent a major makeover during the summer of 2016, relocating the gazebo and adding a bandstand, public restrooms, and a large group picnic enclosure. In September 2017, Grinnell's first independently owned, boutique hotel (Hotel Grinnell) opened downtown across from Central Park giving visitors luxury accommodations.

Retirement communities 
Grinnell is home to two growing retirement communities, the Mayflower community in the middle of town and Seeland Park on the eastern edge. Both communities include housing options for independent living, including duplexes and apartments, and also assisted living accommodations.

Arts and culture

Arts
 The Grinnell Area Arts Council (GAAC) began in 1979 and sponsors many of the creative projects in Grinnell, including various community theater plays, the community band and a summer arts camp. Each season, the GAAC offers a variety of different classes including theater classes, crafts classes, and language classes. GAAC also sponsors various events throughout the year, such as Music in the Park, a free event offered to community members. The Turlach Ur bagpipe band is also a program of GAAC.  The Grinnell Arts Center is housed in the renovated old library building. It includes a gallery on the main floor and a small theater performance space on the top level.
 The Grinnell College Museum of Art at Grinnell College showcases exhibitions of artists in a 7,400 square feet space situated in the heart of Grinnell College's Bucksbaum Center for the Arts. Exhibitions by members of the Grinnell College art faculty can be seen throughout the year, and in May, the annual Student Art Salon features student work.

Architecture 

Grinnell has several notable architectural landmarks: Among them, includes the Merchants' National Bank, designed by architect Louis Sullivan in 1914. The bank is one in a series of small banks, referred to as "Jewel Boxes" designed by Sullivan in the Midwest. The Ricker House was designed by Walter Burley Griffin Marion Mahony Griffin in 1911 and completed in 1912. It was the first of seven houses the Griffins designed for Iowa clients, six of which were built and the other five of which are in Mason City. Ricker House was purchased by Grinnell College in 2000 and is operated as a short-term residence for guests of the college for several years. The house was sold in 2019 and became a private residence.

Festivals and events

Grinnell Farmers Market features locally grown produce, freshly baked goods, honey, jams, plants and flowers, and handmade crafts.  The market runs from May 16 through October 14 on Thursday and Saturdays. It is located in Grinnell's Central Park, located at 833 4th Avenue.

Grinnell Games is a weekend family sports festival. Community-organized events include Imagine Grinnell's Half Marathon and 5K Run, the Twilight Bike Criterium, The Amazing Chase, Twilight Trail Run, and the Warrior Run. Grinnell Games draws visitors from across the state with its family-friendly activities, sidewalk sales, live music, and a beer garden on Saturday night.

Media
The Grinnell Herald-Register is a semi-weekly newspaper in Grinnell, Iowa. It was formed on February 13, 1936, after the merger of the Grinnell Herald and Grinnell Register. The Herald was founded on August 16, 1871, as a semi-weekly newspaper, and the Register was founded in 1888. The Grinnell Herald, in turn, was founded as the Poweshiek County Herald on March 18, 1868.

The Poweshiek County Chronicle Republican – often referred to as the Poweshiek County CR or simply The CR – was created in January 2009 as the result of a merger of two newspapers serving other communities in Poweshiek County, the Brooklyn Chronicle and the Montezuma Republican; the Pennysaver, a shopper that had operated in Grinnell, continued, and the new newspaper began incorporating Grinnell news along with its existing coverage of rural Poweshiek County and its communities.

Radio

Government and infrastructure

Education 
The first school in Grinnell was founded in 1855.  Public schools within the Grinnell–Newburg Community School District  include Fairview Elementary School (K-2nd grade for the eastern side of town), Bailey Park Elementary School (K–2nd grade for the western side of town), Davis School (3rd–4th grade), Grinnell–Newburg Middle School (5th–8th grade) and Grinnell–Newburg High School (9th–12th grade). There is one private school, Central Iowa Christian School, which enrolls about 35 students in kindergarten through eighth grade. Grinnell is home to Grinnell College, a private liberal arts college. Iowa Valley Community College also operates a satellite campus on the western edge of Grinnell.

Health care 
In 2019, the local hospital became a part of the Unity Point Hospital system. Unity Point Grinnell, formerly known as Grinnell Regional Medical Center, is an acute care hospital licensed for 81 beds. GRMC was established in 1967 after the merger of two hospitals, one step in a century of providers joining together to serve the community. Nearly 60 physicians provide care at the medical center.

Library 

Drake Community Library opened in November 2009. The library serves as a center of community activities. It has 25 public computers, 3 large meetings rooms, two small study rooms, a variety of seating areas and offers a full range of reading and AV materials. The library is actively working to create a digital archive of local history. A wide range of photos and documents are available for viewing as part of Digital Grinnell and the Poweshiek History Preservation Project. Area residents can also use the Grinnell College Libraries.  In 1901, Joel Stewart funded the construction of the first library in Grinnell, the Stewart Library, which served in that capacity until 2009. The building remains in service today as the headquarters for the Grinnell Area Arts Council.

Parks and recreation
Grinnell has nine parks that are run by Parks and Recreations, including Arbor Lake, Bailey Park, Central Park, Jaycee Park, Lions Park, Merrill Park, Miller Park, Thomazin Park, and Van Horn Park.  Ahrens and Paschall Memorial Park is privately run by the Claude & Dolly Ahrens Foundation. The city boasts three aquatic centers.  A small indoor pool is part of the Ahrens Family Center. The Grinnell Mutual Family Aquatic Center is open during the summer months. Area residents also have access to the College Natatoriaum Grinnell and other college athletic facilities.

Museums and art galleries
Grinnell Historical Museum was founded as a community collaborative effort through a contest for community development by the Grinnell Herald Register in 1950. Four women's groups—two chapters of the DAR, the Historical and Literary Club, and the Tuesday Club, took as their project the creation of a museum. People responded enthusiastically; donations included a rope bed, a hair wreath, and the twisted bell clapper from the ruins of the first High School, which had burned. The house the museum is currently situated in was generously donated by Rubie Burton. Displays are of interest to visitors of all ages. The kitchen holds an electric refrigerator made by the Grinnell Washing Machine Company, one of the first 50 made in 1932. There is a Military exhibit with uniforms from the Civil War to the Vietnam war. The Carriage House holds several horse-drawn vehicles built by the Spaulding Carriage Factory in Grinnell.

The Stewart Gallery features works of local and regional artists. Located in the old Stewart Library building, the space includes high ceilings and nice light. The Stewart Art Center also includes the Loft Theater space and is home to the Grinnell Community Theater.

The Faulconer Gallery (now called the Grinnell College Museum of Art) on the Grinnell College campus features year-round exhibits of regional, national and international artists. The space is inside the Bucksbaum Center for the Arts.

Transportation

Highways
  Interstate 80 to Davenport and Des Moines
  U.S. Route 6 to Iowa City and Des Moines
  Iowa Highway 146 to Le Grand and New Sharon

Rail
Grinnell is served by two freight-only railroad lines: 
 Union Pacific Oskaloosa Subdivision from Marshalltown to Eddyville
 Iowa Interstate Railroad mainline from Council Bluffs to Bureau Junction, Illinois, and on to Chicago
The two lines meet in a diamond near The Peppertree at the Depot Crossing, a railroad-themed restaurant. The Union Pacific line sees 3 trains per day  while the IAIS line sees about 2 trains per day.

Airport

The Grinnell Regional Airport, also known as Billy Robinson Field, is a city-owned airport located within city limits about 2 miles south of the town center. The airport provides private and charter flights, and saw an average of 114 aircraft operations per week during 2019.

Community organizations 
The Imagine Grinnell Foundation is a small, grassroots foundation that focuses on quality of life issues, such as a healthy and sustainable environment, that complement economic efforts.

The Claude & Dolly Ahrens Foundation provides space and office support for the Greater Poweshiek Community Foundation, the Imagine Grinnell Foundation, and other foundations that are sheltered under the Greater Poweshiek Community Foundation umbrella. The Ahrens Foundation focuses on quality of life, health, and parks and recreation through overseeing its own property and collaborating with partner institutions.

The Greater Poweshiek Community Foundation serves as an umbrella organization for smaller nonprofits in the Grinnell area, and helps with their financial management.

Mid Iowa Community Action is a private nonprofit that seeks to help those affected by poverty.

The Grinnell Area Arts Council encourages artistic expression at the Grinnell Art Center and throughout the community.

Notable people

 John O. Bailey (1880–1959), judge and politician who served as the Chief Justice of the Oregon Supreme Court, was born in Grinnell and attended local schools before enrolling at Harvard University.
 Bruce Braley (born 1957), former member of the U.S. House of Representatives for Iowa's 1st congressional district, was born in Grinnell.
 Pete Brownell (born 1969), CEO of Brownell's Inc. and President of the National Rifle Association from May 2017 to May 2018.
Cornelia Clarke (1884-1936), nature photographer
 Jeff Criswell (born 1964), offensive lineman who played twelve seasons in the National Football League, was born in Grinnell.
 Kirby Criswell (born 1957), linebacker who played two seasons in the National Football League, was born and raised in Grinnell and attended Grinnell High School.
 John Darnielle (born 1967), musician and novelist, the main creative force behind The Mountain Goats.
 Josiah Bushnell Grinnell (1821–1891), city founder and abolitionist to whom Horace Greeley is quoted as having said: "Go West, young man, go West." This story is almost certainly apocryphal, as Greeley claimed that he never said those words to anyone.
 Danai Gurira, actress, known for her role as Michonne in the hit television series The Walking Dead and as Okoye in the Marvel Cinematic Universe.
 Hallie Flanagan (1890–1969), Federal Theater Project head, grew up in Grinnell and also attended Grinnell College.
 Harry Hopkins (1890–1946), one of President Franklin D. Roosevelt's advisors and New Deal architect, lived in Grinnell as a teenager before attending Grinnell College.
 Joe Lacina (born 1985), artist.
 Helen Lemme (1904–1968), civil rights advocate.
 David R. Nagle (born 1943), Democratic member of the U.S. House of Representatives from 1987 to 1993, was born in Grinnell.
 Robert Noyce (1927–1990), physicist and inventor who co-founded Fairchild Semiconductor and Intel Corporation, he grew up in Grinnell and attended Grinnell College.
 Bernard E. Pedersen (1925–1996), Illinois businessman and legislator, was born in Grinnell.
 Billy Robinson (1884–1916), pioneer aviator, moved to Grinnell at the age of 12.

In popular culture
 Robert A. Heinlein's 1951 novel The Puppet Masters begins with government agents attempting to investigate an alien ship that landed near Grinnell.
 Ray Bradbury references Grinnell in The Martian Chronicles and Dandelion Wine.
 Dean Bakopoulos's 2015 novel Summerlong is set in Grinnell. 
 The 2018 film Saint's Rest was filmed at the Saint's Rest coffee shop in Grinnell.
 In the film The Half of It, which won the Founders Award at the 2020 Tribeca Film Festival, the main character Ellie Chu eventually attends Grinnell College.  Her teacher, a Grinnell alumnus, has encouraged her to apply.

See also

References

External links

 
 Grinnell Chamber of Commerce

 
1854 establishments in Iowa
Cities in Iowa
Cities in Poweshiek County, Iowa
Populated places established in 1854
Populated places on the Underground Railroad
Underground Railroad in Iowa